Mark Spooner (born 12 December 1984 in Auckland) is a New Zealand weightlifter. Spooner represented New Zealand at the 2008 Summer Olympics in Beijing, where he competed for the men's lightweight category (69 kg). Spooner placed 21st in this event, as he successfully lifted 123 kg in the single-motion snatch, and hoisted 158 kg in the two-part, shoulder-to-overhead clean and jerk, for a total of 281 kg.

References

External links

NBC 2008 Olympics profile

New Zealand male weightlifters
1984 births
Living people
Olympic weightlifters of New Zealand
Weightlifters at the 2008 Summer Olympics
Sportspeople from Auckland
Weightlifters at the 2006 Commonwealth Games
Weightlifters at the 2010 Commonwealth Games
Weightlifters at the 2014 Commonwealth Games
Commonwealth Games competitors for New Zealand
20th-century New Zealand people
21st-century New Zealand people